Bathymicrops is a genus of deepsea tripod fishes.

Species
There are currently four recognized species in this genus:
 Bathymicrops belyaninae J. G. Nielsen & Merrett, 1992
 Bathymicrops brevianalis J. G. Nielsen, 1966 (Shortarse feelerfish)
 Bathymicrops multispinis J. G. Nielsen & Merrett, 1992
 Bathymicrops regis Hjort & Koefoed, 1912

References

Ipnopidae